Oscar Korbla Mawuli Awuku (born 18 May 1999), better known as Yonga Arts, the name of his artistic brand, is a Ghanaian body artist, painter, and sculptor.

Early life and education
Awuku was born in Accra to Maxwell Awuku and Bridgette Dzidzineyo as the first of three boys. He got his basic school education at Senajoy Preparatory School in Accra and later went to Mawuli School, where he studied visual arts.

He was primarily raised by his mother, who supported his artistic interests from a young age. While growing up, Awuku witnessed the struggles and abuse his mother went through, and this inspired him in his eventual artistic direction. In a 2020 interview with GhanaWeb, he said," I grew up [in] a broken home where I witnessed the violence my mum had to go through before she finally became the breadwinner for the family...whilst growing up, all I ever wanted to do was depict the strength and empowerment of women and also their ability to procreate and nurture."Awuku is currently studying Commercial Arts in Painting at Takoradi Technical University, Sekondi-Takoradi.

Career
Awuku calls his art Anansinisim, inspired by the Akan mythical spider character Kweku Anansi. He often depicts historical Ghanaian Adinkra symbology on the bodies which he paints.

In 2020, he was nominated in the Ghana Arts and Culture Awards.

Yonga Arts
According to Awuku, his original intent was to use body art as therapy for the elderly, to make them feel young at heart, and this is how he came up with his brand name—Yonga Arts.

Short film
In November 2020, Awuku announced that he would be releasing a short film showcasing his art, titled Supremacy.

Artistic style
Awuku has said that his work "explores pre-colonial culture but also addresses decolonized practices in contemporary culture"; it looks at the essence of identity of the black body, while advocating for women and seeking to ask empowering questions in society. Referring to the motif of the traditional mask, he says, "My constant use of the ritual mask is based on the belief that it conceptually turns its wearer into the spirit represented by the mask itself."

Gallery

References

External links

1999 births
People from Accra
Ghanaian artists
Living people
Mawuli School alumni
Ghanaian male artists
Body art
21st-century Ghanaian painters